A US Naval captain, Scott Phillpott came to prominence after informing the 2004 9/11 Commission that a data-mining project named Able Danger had identified hijack leader Mohamed Atta as a threat tied to al-Qaeda and living in Brooklyn as early as January 2000, many months before his attack in September 2001.

He was quoted by Fox News in August 2005 as stating I have briefed the Department of the Army, the Special Operations Command and the office of (Undersecretary of Defense for Intelligence) Dr. Cambone as well as the 9/11 Commission. My story has remained consistent.

Phillpott and a civilian technician identified as "JD Smith" were the two sources for Army Lt. Col. Anthony Shaffer's claims of an intelligence failure.

Phillpott has commanded the USS Typhoon (PC 5), USS Samuel Eliot Morison (FFG 13), USS ESTOCIN (FFG-15), and USS Leyte Gulf (CG 55).

References

Living people
United States Navy officers
Year of birth missing (living people)
Place of birth missing (living people)